Rags to riches refers to a rise from poverty to wealth.

Rags to Riches may also refer to:

 Rags to Riches (video game), a 1985 computer game for the Commodore 64
 Rags to Riches (horse), a thoroughbred race horse
 "Rags to Riches" (song), a 1953 popular song by Richard Adler and Jerry Ross, popularized by Tony Bennett
 Rags to Riches (TV series), an American musical comedy drama series
 Rags to Riches (1941 film), a film directed by Joseph Kane
 Rags to Riches (1922 film), a 1922 American drama film
  "Rags to Riches" (song), a track by The Blue Nile from their 1984 album, A Walk Across the Rooftops.

See also
"Rags2Riches" (song), a 2020 song by Rod Wave featuring ATR SonSon